Edgar Samuel John King CMG DSc FRACP FRACS MCPA FAA, (10 June 1900, Mosgiel, Otago, New Zealand – 31 January 1966, East Melbourne, Victoria, Australia), was an Australian surgeon and pathologist.

References

Companions of the Order of St Michael and St George
1900 births
1966 deaths
Fellows of the Australian Academy of Science
Fellows of the Royal Australasian College of Physicians
Fellows of the Royal Australasian College of Surgeons
Australian pathologists
People from Mosgiel
New Zealand emigrants to Australia